"Wild Angels" is a song written by Matraca Berg, Gary Harrison and Harry Stinson and recorded by American country music artist Martina McBride.  It was released in November 1995 as the second single and title track from McBride's album of the same name.  The song reached number one on the US Billboard Hot Country Singles & Tracks (now Hot Country Songs) charts, giving McBride her first number one single on that chart.

Content
The song is about a female who looks at her relationship and concludes that there must be "wild angels" watching over her and her lover to keep them together.

McBride's daughter, Delaney, who was a baby at the time, can be heard laughing in the song's intro. According to her Greatest Hits album, McBride had a difficult time recording Delaney. She also praised the production of Paul Worley and Ed Seay, notably Lonnie Wilson's drum fills and Joe Chemay's bass guitar. Worley described the dual electric guitar tracks, with Dan Dugmore on the right channel and Dann Huff on the left, as "amazing".

Personnel
The following musicians perform on this track:
Joe Chemay – bass guitar
Ashley Cleveland – backing vocals
Dan Dugmore – electric guitar, pedal steel guitar
Vicki Hampton – backing vocals
John Hobbs – keyboards
Dann Huff – electric guitar
Larry Marrs – backing vocals
Martina McBride – lead vocals, tambourine
Harry Stinson – backing vocals
Biff Watson – acoustic guitar
Lonnie Wilson – drums
Paul Worley – acoustic guitar

Music video
The music video was directed by Thom Oliphant and premiered in late 1995.

Chart performance

Year-end charts

References

1995 singles
Martina McBride songs
Songs written by Matraca Berg
Song recordings produced by Paul Worley
RCA Records Nashville singles
Songs written by Gary Harrison
Songs written by Harry Stinson (musician)
1995 songs